Altererythrobacter lauratis is a Gram-negative, moderately thermophilic, rod-shaped and motile bacterium from the genus of Altererythrobacter which has been isolated from the Tagejia hot spring from Tibet.

References

External links
Type strain of Altererythrobacter lauratis at BacDive -  the Bacterial Diversity Metadatabase

Sphingomonadales
Bacteria described in 2017